Evans Glacier is a tributary glacier just south of the Owen Hills, flowing east from the Queen Alexandra Range into Beardmore Glacier. It was named by the New Zealand Geological Survey Antarctic Expedition (1961–62) for Petty Officer Edgar Evans, a member of Scott's South Pole Party of the British Antarctic Expedition, 1910–13, who died near here.

References 

Glaciers of the Ross Dependency
Shackleton Coast